The short-tailed Talaud mosaic-tailed rat or the short-tailed Talaud melomys (Melomys caurinus) is a species of rodent in the family Muridae.
It is endemic to Karakelong and Salebabu in the Talaud Islands in Indonesia where it occurs in forest habitats. The long-tailed Talaud mosaic-tailed rat (Melomys talaudium) is also present on the islands and the shorter tail of this species means that it is likely to be mainly terrestrial whereas M. talaudium is largely arboreal.

References

Melomys
Rats of Asia
Endemic fauna of Indonesia
Rodents of Indonesia
Endangered fauna of Asia
Taxa named by Oldfield Thomas
Mammals described in 1921